Hamatina is a genus of moths in the family Lecithoceridae.

Species
 Hamatina hemitoma (Diakonoff, 1954)
 Hamatina diakonoffi Park, 2011
 Hamatina iriana Park, 2011
 Hamatina jembatana Park, 2011
 Hamatina nabangae Park, 2011
 Hamatina robdevosi Park, 2011

References

 
Lecithocerinae
Moth genera